Victor Alfred Percival Nankervis (4 January 1893 – 4 January 1973) was an Australian rules footballer who played with Essendon and Fitzroy in the Victorian Football League (VFL).

Nankervis appeared in the final five rounds of the 1915 VFL season and didn't play again until the 1918 VFL season, when Essendon returned to the league after a two-year absence. He played just once in 1918 and finished the season at Fitzroy, playing two further games.

He served with the 4th Australian Light Anti-Aircraft Regiment during World War II.

Two of his nephews, Bruce and Ian, had long careers playing for Geelong.

References

1893 births
Australian rules footballers from Melbourne
Essendon Football Club players
Fitzroy Football Club players
1973 deaths
People from Collingwood, Victoria
Australian military personnel of World War II
Military personnel from Melbourne